Bangrin may refer to:
Bangrin, Sabce, Burkina Faso
Bangrin, Zimtenga, Burkina Faso